Dilshod Mahmudov (Дильшод Махмудов; born November 30, 1982) is a retired professional boxer from Uzbekistan who won several medals in international tournaments.

Career

Formally of Uzbekistan, Dilshod Mahmudov is now based at BHS boxing gym in Blacktown, where he calls home. Under the watchful eyes of Lincoln Hudson and Fidel Tukel, entered the ring and stopped Yodmongkol Singmanasak (11-5-1,7KO’s) of Thailand in the fourth round, one month later took to the ring against Thai, Sataporn Singwancha  (19 – 8, 11KO’s) where he showed his total class in destroying the former WBA #14 in 38 seconds into the first round. On feb 13th in Melbourne he made it 3 from 3, crushing Fijian Opeti Tagi (13 – 5, 8KO’s) again in the first round with a crunching body shot.

As an amateur Mahmudov was a silver medal winner at the world championships in Thailand in 2005. He replicated the silver medal in Moscow in 2008 when he came second at the AIBA world Cup. In the Athens Olympics in 2004 the eventual gold medallist defeated him by a single point and again in Beijing the gold medallist defeated him in similar fashion. In 2003 he defeated Australia’s own international star and former world IBO champion Billy Dib as a lightweight.

He won the silver medal at the 2005 World Amateur Boxing Championships in Mianyang, China losing to Serik Sapiyev.

He also participated at the 2004 Summer Olympics for his native Asian country. There he was defeated in the round of sixteen of the Light Welterweight (64 kg) division by Cuba's Yudel Johnson. He qualified for the Athens Games by winning the silver medal at the 2004 Asian Amateur Boxing Championships in Puerto Princesa, Philippines. In the final he was defeated by home fighter Romeo Brin.

At the 2007 World Championships he lost in the very first round to Frenchman Alexis Vastine (27:28).

AIBA World Cup Moscow results 
2008 (as a Light welterweight)
Took 2nd place.

World amateur championships results 
2003 (as a lightweight)
Defeated Murat Khrachev (Russia) 43-22
Defeated Bilal Dib (Australia) 21-5
Lost to Gyula Kate (Hungary) 21-35

2005 (as a Light welterweight)
Defeated Sergey Kudriavcev (Macedonia) 23-14
Defeated Dmitrijs Sostaks (Latvia) RSCO
Defeated Martin Dressen (Germany) 33-13
Defeated Inocente Fiss (Cuba) 37-21
Lost to Serik Sapiyev (Kazakhstan) 21-39

2007 (as a Light welterweight)
Lost to Alexis Vastine (France) 27-28

Olympic results 
2004 (as a Light welterweight)
1st round bye
Defeated Alessandro Matos (Brazil) 26-16
Lost to Yudel Johnson Cedeno (Cuba) 28-32

2008 (as a welterweight)
Defeated Mehdi Khalsi (Morocco) 11-3
Lost to Bakhyt Sarsekbayev 7-12

Professional boxing record

References
 
 

1982 births
Olympic boxers of Uzbekistan
Living people
Light-welterweight boxers
Boxers at the 2004 Summer Olympics
Boxers at the 2008 Summer Olympics
Asian Games medalists in boxing
Boxers at the 2002 Asian Games
Boxers at the 2006 Asian Games
Uzbekistani male boxers
AIBA World Boxing Championships medalists
Asian Games bronze medalists for Uzbekistan
Asian Games gold medalists for Uzbekistan
Medalists at the 2006 Asian Games
Medalists at the 2002 Asian Games